The Ecole des Ursulines, known in English as the School of the Ursulines, is among North America's oldest schools. Still operating as a private school for both girls and boys, it was founded in 1639 by French nun Marie of the Incarnation and  laywoman Marie-Madeline de Chauvigny de la Peltrie. This was also the beginning of the Ursuline order in New France.

The convent has many of its original walls intact and houses a little chapel and a museum. Located in the middle of the historical Old Quebec neighbourhood of Quebec City, Quebec, which is recognized by UNESCO as a World Heritage District. The school has two campuses. In the Quebec City campus, there are more than four hundred children enrolled from pre-school through primary school (5 to 12 years). There is also a coeducational campus in Loretteville.

See also
Ursulines of Quebec
Ursulines
Old Quebec

References

External links

 Ecole des Ursulines official website

Elementary schools in Quebec
Schools in Quebec City
History of Quebec City
Old Quebec
History of Catholicism in Quebec
1639 establishments in the French colonial empire
Roman Catholic schools in Quebec
Ursuline schools
New France
Educational institutions established in the 1630s
Catholic elementary schools in Canada
French colonial architecture in Canada